Dvorishchi is the name of several rural localities in Russia:
Dvorishchi, Ivanovo Oblast, a village in Yuryevetsky District of Ivanovo Oblast
Dvorishchi, Kostroma Oblast, a village in Apraksinskoye Settlement of Kostromskoy District of Kostroma Oblast
Dvorishchi, Khvoyninsky District, Novgorod Oblast, a village in Dvorishchenskoye Settlement of Khvoyninsky District of Novgorod Oblast
Dvorishchi, Malovishersky District, Novgorod Oblast, a village in Burginskoye Settlement of Malovishersky District of Novgorod Oblast
Dvorishchi, Pskov Oblast, a village in Pustoshkinsky District of Pskov Oblast
Dvorishchi, Tver Oblast, a village in Lesnoy District of Tver Oblast
Dvorishchi, Vladimir Oblast, a village in Kirzhachsky District of Vladimir Oblast